The 1977 Tour de France was the 64th edition of the Tour de France, one of cycling's Grand Tours. The Tour began in Fleurance with a prologue individual time trial on 30 June, and Stage 12 occurred on 13 July with a mountainous stage from Roubaix. The race finished in Paris on 24 July.

Stage 12
13 July 1977 – Roubaix to Charleroi,

Stage 13a
14 July 1977 – Freiburg to Freiburg,

Stage 13b
14 July 1977 – Altkirch to Besançon,

Rest day 2
15 July 1977 – Freiburg

Stage 14
16 July 1977 – Besançon to Thonon-les-Bains,

Stage 15a
17 July 1977 – Thonon-les-Bains to Morzine,

Stage 15b
17 July 1977 – Morzine to Avoriaz,  (ITT)

Stage 16
18 July 1977 – Morzine to Chamonix,

Stage 17
19 July 1977 – Chamonix to Alpe d'Huez,

Stage 18
20 July 1977 – Rossignol Voiron to Saint-Étienne,

Stage 19
21 July 1977 – Saint-Trivier-sur-Moignans to Dijon,

Stage 20
22 July 1977 – Dijon to Dijon,  (ITT)

Stage 21
23 July 1977 – Montereau-Fault-Yonne to Versailles,

Stage 22a
24 July 1977 – Paris to Paris,  (ITT)

Stage 22b
24 July 1977 – Paris to Paris Champs-Élysées,

Notes

References

1977 Tour de France
Tour de France stages